Rob Roy is a 1922 British silent historical film directed by W. P. Kellino and starring David Hawthorne, Gladys Jennings and Simeon Stuart. It depicts the life of the early 18th century outlaw Rob Roy MacGregor.

Cast
 David Hawthorne as Rob Roy MacGregor 
 Gladys Jennings as Helen Campbell 
 Simeon Stuart as Duke of Montrose 
 Wallace Bosco as James Grahame 
 Alec Hunter as The Dougal Creature 
 Tom Morris as Sandy the Biter 
 Eva Llewellyn as Mother MacGregor 
 Roy Kellino as Ronald MacGregor, the Child

Bibliography
 Low, Rachael. History of the British Film, 1918–1929. George Allen & Unwin, 1971.

External links

1922 films
1920s historical drama films
British silent feature films
British historical drama films
Cultural depictions of Rob Roy MacGregor
Films directed by W. P. Kellino
Films set in Scotland
Films set in the 18th century
Films based on works by Walter Scott
British black-and-white films
1922 drama films
1920s English-language films
1920s British films
Silent historical drama films